Local elections were held in Calamba, Laguna, on May 9, 2022, within the Philippine general election, for posts of the mayor, vice mayor and twelve councilors. They will also elect their  representative of their  lone congressional district.

Overview
Incumbent Mayor Justin Marc Chipeco is term-limited and will run for district representative. His  brother, Councilor Julian Eugene Chipeco is seeking for a mayoral seat. His opponents are Vice Mayor Roseller Rizal and former Laguna Governor Emilio Ramon Ejercito.

Candidates

Team One Calamba

Team CalamBAGO

Liberal Party

Partido Federal ng Pilipinas

Independents

Results
The candidates for mayor and vice mayor with the highest number of votes will win.
Candidates who are incumbent in the position they are running are in italic text.

Mayoral election
Incumbent Timmy Chipeco is term-limited and is running for congressman. His brother, incumbent councilor Joey Chipeco is his party's nominee. His opponents are former governor ER Ejercito and incumbent Vice Mayor Roseller Rizal.

Vice mayoral election 
Incumbent Roseller Rizal is term-limited and is running for mayor. His party nominated incumbent councilor Angelito Lazaro, Jr. His opponent is incumbent councilor Soliman Rajay Lajara.

Congressional election
Incumbent Joaquin Chipeco, Jr. is term-limited. His son, incumbent Mayor Justin Marc Chipeco is his party's nominee. His opponents are incumbent Councilor Charisse Anne Hernandez and Emerson Panganiban. Hernandez is Chipeco's former ally.

City Council elections
Voters will elect twelve councilors to comprise the City Council or the Sangguniang Panlungsod.

Among the candidates, seven are incumbent councilors and are seeking for reelection. Three of the candidates are former councilors (Santiago Atienza, Luis Vergel Baroro, and Moises Morales). Incumbent councilors Julian Eugene Chipeco, Charisse Anne Hernandez and Angelito Lazaro will run as mayor, congressman  and vice mayor respectively.

 

|-
|bgcolor=black colspan=5|

References

External links
 Official website of the Commission on Elections
  Official website of National Movement for Free Elections (NAMFREL)
 Official website of the Parish Pastoral Council for Responsible Voting (PPCRV)

2022 Philippine local elections
Elections in Calamba, Laguna